Kim Sa-rang may refer to:
 Kim Sa-rang (actress) (born 1978), South Korean actress
 Kim Sa-rang (singer) (born 1981), South Korean rock singer-songwriter
 Kim Sa-rang (badminton) (born 1989), South Korean badminton player